Miletić (plural: Miletići, Милетићи) is a Bosnian, Croatian, and Serbian surname, and is one of the common surnames in Bosnia and Herzegovina, Croatia and Serbia.

It derives from personal name Mileta, cognate of the English name Milius. The suffix ić is a diminutive designation, or descendant designation. Thus the last name can be translated as Mileta's son.

There are several families in Bosnia and Herzegovina, Croatia, Montenegro and Serbia who carry this last name. The most numerous and the most prominent of the Miletići are found in Bosnia and Herzegovina, and in Croatia.

It is one of the most common surnames in two counties of Croatia.

People with last name Miletić:
 Boris Miletić (born 1975), Croatian politician and mayor of Pula
 Ljubica Miletić (1948–2020), Serbian poet, translator and essayist
 Lyubomir Miletich (1863–1937), Bulgarian linguist, ethnographer, dialectologist and historian, brother of Svetozar Miletić
 Marinko Miletić (born 1980), German football player of Croatian origin currently playing for Rot-Weiß Oberhausen
 Miloje Miletić (born 1953), Lt. General, Chief-of-staff of the Serbian Armed Forces
 Minja Miletić (born 1980), Serbian journalist and television presenter
 Miroslav Miletić (1925–2018), Croatian composer and viola player
 Nemanja Miletić (footballer, born January 1991), Serbian footballer
 Nemanja Miletić (footballer, born July 1991), Serbian footballer
 Oktavijan Miletić (1902–1987), Croatian cinematographer and Film director
 Pat Miletić (born 1966), Croatian mixed martial artist (MMA), known as The Croatian Sensation
 Predrag Miletić (born 1952), Serbian film, television, and theatre actor
 Predrag Miletić (basketball) (born 1984), Serbian basketball player
 Slavomir Miletić (born 1930), Yugoslav sculptor from Bosnia and Herzegovina, now living in the Netherlands
 Slobodan Miletić (born 1969), Serbian footballer
 Svetozar Miletić (1826–1901), an advocate, politician, mayor of Novi Sad, and the political leader of Serbs in Vojvodina

Places named Miletić:
 Miletići in Bosnia and Herzegovina
 Srpski Miletić in Serbia
 Miletićevo in Serbia

References 

Serbian surnames
Croatian surnames
Patronymic surnames
Surnames from given names